Alberto Vázquez Gurrola (born Guaymas, 20 April 1940) is a Mexican singer and actor from part of the golden age generation of rock and roll in Mexico. He had a son, Arturo Vazquez, who also became a singer, with actress Isela Vega, but the couple never married.

Discography
 Ritmos Juveniles (LP, album) Musart	D697	1962		
 Alberto Vázquez (LP, album)	Musart	D 781	1963		
 Alberto Vázquez Vol. 3 (LP, album)	Musart	D 893	1964		
 Baladas Bailables (LP, album)	Musart	D 1014	1964		
 Alberto Vázquez Vol. 4 (LP, album)	Musart	D 975	1964		
 Nuevos Éxitos de Alberto Vázquez (LP, album)	Musart	D 1140.	1965		
 El Estilo Ranchero De Alberto Vazquez (LP)	Musart	1410	1968		
 El Amor Es Triste (LP, album)	Musart	D 1375	1968		
 El Estilo Ranchero De Alberto Vazquez Vol. 2 (LP)	Musart	ED 1455	1969		
 Alberto Vazquez (3xLP, album)	Musart	DC 1488	1970		
 Soñando Con El Amor (LP)	Musart, Musart	1520, ED 1520	1971		
 Rancheras De Exito (LP)	Musart	1577	1972		
 Alberto Vazquez (LP)	Gas Records	4079	1973		
 Rock (LP)	Trebol Records	T 10476	1974		
 Rock Y Baldas Con Alberto Vazquez (LP)	Discos Gas	1018	1974		
 Perla Negra, Alberto Vazquez - Perla Negra (LP)	Gas Records (6)	4071	1975		
 Las Dos Caras De Alverto Vazquez (15 Super Exitos) (LP, album)	Telediscos	DAL 1024	1982		
 Alberto Vázquez (LP, album)	Musart	CDN 522	1988		
 Cosas de (CD, album)	Epic	CDDE 479928	1994		
 Ven Amorcito, Ven (LP)	Musart	DM 1276 		
 Amorosa (LP, album)	Pan Americana De Discos, S.A.	PALP 619

Filmography 
 A ritmo de twist, directed by Benito Alazraki, 1962
 La edad de la violencia, 1964
 Un callejón sin salida, 1964
 Luna de miel para nueve, 1964
 Perdóname mi vida, 1965
 Santo contra el estrangulador, 1965
 La alegría de vivir, 1965
 Lanza tus penas al viento, with Fernando Luján, 1966
 Serenata en noche de luna, with Gina Romand, 1967
 Me quiero casar, with Angélica María, 1967
 Caballos de acero, with Fernando Luján, 1967
 Vestidas y alborotadas, 1968
 Patrulla de valientes, 1968
 Romeo contra Julieta, with Angélica María, Fernando Soler and Eduardo López Rojas, 1968
 Cuando los hijos se van, with Fernando and Andrés Soler, 1968
 Faltas a la moral, 1970
 Pancho Tequila, 1970
 Jóvenes de la Zona Rosa, 1970
 Un amante anda suelto, 1970
 Águilas de acero 1971, with José Galvez, Nadia Milton, and Rodolfo de Anda
 Nido de fieras, 1971
 Caín, Abel y el otro, with Enrique Guzmán, César Costa, Lorena Velázquez and Germán Valdés, 1971
 Ni solteros, ni casados, 1972
 Mi niño Tizoc, produced by Ismael Rodríguez, 1972
 Pilotos de combate, 1973
 Ni solteros, ni cazados, 1980
 Amor a navaja libre, with Pedro Weber "Chatanuga", 1982
Telenovelas
 Nosotros los pobres, 1973
 Agujetas de color de rosa, 1994
 El secreto, as Alberto, 2001

References

1940 births
Latin Grammy Lifetime Achievement Award winners
Living people